This article is a non-exhaustive lists of names used by the Dacian people, who were among the inhabitants of Eastern Europe before and during the Roman Empire. Many hundreds of personal names and placenames are known from ancient sources, and they throw light on the Dacian language and the extent to which it differed from Thracian.

Anthroponyms 

Around 1150 Dacian anthroponyms (personal names) and 900 toponyms (placenames) have been preserved in ancient sources. As far as the onomastic (proper names) of Dacians and Thracians is concerned, opinions are divided. According to Crossland (1982), the evidence of names from the Dacian, Mysian and Thracian area seems to indicate divergence of a 'Thraco-Dacian' language into northern and southern groups of dialects, but not so different as to rank Thracian and Dacian as separate languages, There were also the development of special tendencies in word formation and of certain secondary phonetic features in each group. Mateescu (1923), Rosetti (1978) sustain that Thracian onomastic include elements that are common to Geto-Dacians and Bessians (a Thracian tribe). A part of researchers support that onomastically, Dacians are not different from the other Thracians in Roman Dacia's inscriptions. But recently, D. Dana basing himself on new onomastic material recorded in Egyptian ostraka suggested criteria which would make possible to distinguish between closely related Thracian and Dacian-Moesian names and singled out certain specific elements for the latter.

In Georgiev's opinion (1960; 1977) Dacian placenames and personal names are "completely different" from their Thracian counterparts.

Several Dacian names have also been identified with ostracons of Dacian cavalry recruited after the Roman conquest and stationed in East Egypt, i.e. Dadas and Dadazi, Zoutoula, Dotos and Dotouzi, Dieri and Diernais, Diengis, Dida(s), Blaikisa, Blegissa, Diourdanos, Thiadicem, Avizina, Dourpokis, Kaigiza, Dardiolai, Denzibalos (see also Dacian king name Deki-balos), Denzi-balus (attested in Britain), Pouridour, Thiaper and Tiatitis, Dekinais, *Rolouzis, (See Ostraca from Krokodilo and Didymoi)

A

B

C

D

K

M

N

O

P

R

S

T

V

Z

Toponyms

Hydronyms

See also 
 Dacian language
 List of Dacian plant names
 List of Romanian words of possible Dacian origin
 Davae
 List of Dacian towns
 List of Dacian tribes
 List of Dacian kings
 List of historical monuments in Romania

Notes

References

Ancient

Modern 

 
 
 
 
 
 
 
 
 
 
 
 
 
 
 
 
 
 
 
 
 
 
 
 
  Google books

Further reading 

 
 http://bmcr.brynmawr.edu/2007/2007-01-29.html
 http://www.zaw.uni-heidelberg.de/hps/pap/WL/Kontr.pdf
 https://www.scribd.com/doc/17495403/Bogdan-Murgescu-Istoria-Romaniei-in-texte-
 https://www.scribd.com/doc/16509714/Vasile-Parvan-Cetatea-Tropaeum-Consideraii-istorice
 About Berzovia http://www.net4u.ro/index.php?option=com_content&view=article&id=227%3Abersobis&Itemid=59&lang=ro
 https://web.archive.org/web/20120316100512/http://www.net4u.ro/index.php?option=com_content&view=article&id=76&Itemid=1&lang=en

External links 

 Ostraca de Krokodilo and  full list of names Ostraca de Krokodilo
 Inscription on costoboc funeral stone in Rome
 Vasile Pârvan, Cetatea Tropaeum. Consideraţii istorice

Dacia
Dacian language
Dacian names